John Turpin may refer to:
 John Turpin (boxer), English boxer
 John Henry Turpin, sailor in the United States Navy